Jarrod Carluccio (born 8 February 2001), is an Australian professional footballer who plays as a winger for Western Sydney Wanderers.

Honours

International
Australia U20
AFF U-19 Youth Championship: 2019

References

External links

2001 births
Living people
Australian soccer players
Association football forwards
Western Sydney Wanderers FC players
National Premier Leagues players
A-League Men players
Australian people of Italian descent